(Butirosin acyl-carrier protein)—L-glutamate ligase ([BtrI acyl-carrier protein]—L-glutamate ligase, BtrJ) is an enzyme with systematic name (BtrI acyl-carrier protein):L-glutamate ligase (ADP-forming). This enzyme catalyses the following chemical reaction

 (1) ATP + L-glutamate + BtrI acyl-carrier protein  ADP + phosphate + L-glutamyl-[BtrI acyl-carrier protein]
 (2) ATP + L-glutamate + 4-amino butanoyl-[BtrI acyl-carrier protein]  ADP + phosphate + 4-(gamma-L-glutamylamino)butanoyl-[BtrI acyl-carrier protein]

This enzyme catalyses two steps in the biosynthesis of the side chain of the aminoglycoside antibiotics of the butirosin family.

References

External links 
 

EC 6.2.1